Joshua Mahura (born May 5, 1998) is a Canadian professional ice hockey defenceman who is currently playing for the  Florida Panthers of the National Hockey League (NHL).

Playing career

Major junior
Mahura began his major junior hockey career with the Red Deer Rebels, who had drafted him in the second round, 36th overall, in the 2013 WHL Draft.

In his second year with the Rebels, and his first year as a draft eligible player, Mahura tore his MCL and missed the entire regular season to recover. He returned in May to play in the Memorial Cup.  Mahura was drafted in the third round, 85th overall by the Ducks in the 2016 NHL Entry Draft. 

On January 10, 2017, Mahura was traded by the Rebels mid-season to the Regina Pats along with Jeff de Wit and a conditional third round pick in 2019 in exchange for Lane Zablocki, Dawson Barteaux, a first round pick in 2017, a first rounder in either 2018 or 2019, and a conditional third rounder in 2020. At the time of the trade, Mahura had collected nine goals and 24 assists in 39 games. He was signed to a three-year, entry-level contract with the Ducks on May 18, 2017.  The following season, Mahura was named an alternate captain for the Pats, alongside Jake Leschyshyn and Matt Bradley.

Professional
During his first professional season in 2018–19, Mahura was recalled to the Ducks from AHL affiliate, the San Diego Gulls, on November 18, 2018 after injuries to Cam Fowler and Hampus Lindholm. He made his NHL debut that night against the Colorado Avalanche, recording a plus 2 and six blocks. Mahura was one of four rookie defencemen to play that night. The Ducks had not played four rookie defencemen in one game since May 3, 1995. 

Prior to the  season, on October 10, 2022, Mahura was claimed off waivers by the Florida Panthers.

Personal life
Mahura's brother Luke also plays hockey. He played in the WHL for the Prince Albert Raiders and currently plays for the Morinville Kings of the North Central Senior Hockey League.

Career statistics

Regular season and playoffs

International

Awards and honours

References

External links
 

1998 births
Living people
Anaheim Ducks draft picks
Anaheim Ducks players
Canadian expatriate ice hockey players in the United States
Canadian ice hockey defencemen
Florida Panthers players
Ice hockey people from Alberta
Regina Pats players
Red Deer Rebels players
San Diego Gulls (AHL) players
Sportspeople from St. Albert, Alberta